The Shakespeare Theatre Association (STA), Formally known as The Shakespeare Theatre Association of America, was established to provide a forum for the artistic and managerial leadership of theatres whose central activity is the production of Shakespeare's plays; to discuss issues and share methods of work, resources, and information; and to act as an advocate for Shakespearean productions throughout the world. The name was changed in January 2011 to reflect the increasingly international reach of Shakespeare and the Shakespeare Theatre Association.

History
The Shakespeare Theatre Association of America was organized at a meeting held January 12 and 13, 1991 at the Folger Library and the Kennedy Center, Washington DC. Sidney Berger, Producing Director of the Houston Shakespeare Festival, and Douglas Cook, Producing Artistic Director of the Utah Shakespearean Festival, invited the producers, artistic directors and managing directors of over thirty-seven Shakespeare festivals and companies from the United States and Canada to this meeting. Berger was elected the first President, and Cook the first Vice President.

Past Conferences
The annual conference is the most important activity of the STA.

References

External links
 STAA Homepage

Shakespearean theatre companies